The 2013 Premier Bank Bangladesh Championship League started on 11 February 2013 where 8 clubs competed with each other on home and away basis.

Teams and locations

The following 8 clubs competed in the Bangladesh Championship League during the 2013 season.

 Agrani Bank SC, Dhaka
 Chittagong Abahani, Chittagong
 Dhaka United, Dhaka
 Farashganj SC, Dhaka
 Rahmatganj MFS, Dhaka
 Uttar Baridhara SC, Dhaka
 Victoria SC, Dhaka
 Wari Club, Dhaka

The venues were-
 Bir Sherestha Shaheed Shipahi Mostafa Kamal Stadium, Dhaka
 MA Aziz Stadium, Chittagong

Standings

References

2012
2
Bangladesh
Bangladesh